Canada Square  is a complex of three interconnected office buildings located at Yonge and Eglinton in Toronto, Ontario, Canada, including a small shopping concourse. The two main towers are examples of International Style.

The complex's largest tenant is Canadian Tire, which has offices in all three buildings and its head office at 2180 Yonge Street.

Buildings

2200 Yonge Street
2200 Yonge Street is located directly above the Toronto Transit Commission's Eglinton station and has connecting passages to the station as well as to the Yonge Eglinton Centre across the street. The building was built in 1962 and has 17 floors. It has  of space. The building's major tenants are Canadian Tire, Procom Consultants, and the headquarters of the YMCA of Greater Toronto.

2190 Yonge Street
Its major tenant is Canadian Tire. It also previously had a Famous Players movie theatre which closed after the end of business on October 24, 2021.

2180 Yonge Street
Its major tenants are Canadian Tire's head office and TVO.

References 

Buildings and structures in Toronto
Modernist architecture in Canada
Canadian Tire
TVO